Might and the Man is a 1917 American silent drama film directed by Edward Dillon and starring Elmo Lincoln, Carmel Myers and Wilbur Higby.

Cast
 Elmo Lincoln as McFadden
 Carmel Myers as Winifred
 Wilbur Higby as Hiram Sloan
 Lillian Langdon as Mrs. Sloan
 Clyde E. Hopkins as Clarence Whitman 
 Carl Stockdale as Billings
 Luray Huntley as Kate
 Mazie Radford as Pansy

References

Bibliography
 Robert B. Connelly. The Silents: Silent Feature Films, 1910-36, Volume 40, Issue 2. December Press, 1998.

External links
 

1917 films
1917 drama films
1910s English-language films
American silent feature films
Silent American drama films
American black-and-white films
Triangle Film Corporation films
Films directed by Edward Dillon
1910s American films